Club Social Deportivo Camaná (sometimes referred as Deportivo Camaná) is a Peruvian football club, playing in the city of Camaná, Arequipa, Peru.

History
The Club Deportivo Camaná was founded on August 20, 1949.

In 1986 Copa Perú, the club classified to the Final Stage, but was eliminated when finished in 3rd place.

In 2003 Copa Perú, the club classified to the Departamental Stage, but was eliminated by Deportivo Sipesa.

In 2009 Ligas Superiores del Peru, the club was eliminated when finished in 9th place.

In 2012 Copa Perú, the club classified to the Departamental Stage, but was eliminated by José Granda in the Second Stage.

Honours

Regional
Liga Departamental de Arequipa:
Winners (5): 1981, 1984, 1985, 1988, 1989
Runner-up (1): 1996

Liga Provincial de Camaná:
Winners (3): 1996, 2001, 2003
Runner-up (1): 2012

Liga Distrital de Camaná:
Winners (4): 1996, 2003, 2012, 2022
Runner-up (1): 2016

See also
List of football clubs in Peru
Peruvian football league system

References

External links
 

Football clubs in Peru
Association football clubs established in 1949
1949 establishments in Peru